The 2007 Italian Athletics Championships was the 97th edition of the Italian Athletics Championships and were held in Padua.

Men

Women

References

External links 
Full results at FIDAL

Italian Athletics Championships
Athletics
Italian Athletics Outdoor Championships
Athletics competitions in Italy
Sport in Padua